The 2018–19 Cyprus Basketball Division A is the 52nd season of the Cyprus Basketball Division A, the top-tier level men's professional basketball league on Cyprus. It started on 13 October 2018.

Competition format
Eight teams joined the regular season, where after a three-legs round-robin tournament, the four first qualified would join the playoffs for the title.

AEL and Omonia promoted from Division 2 while APOP was relegated.

Teams and locations

Regular season

League table

Results

Playoffs

Bracket
Semifinals were played in a best-of-three games, while the finals, in a best-of five one with seeded teams playing games 1, 2 and (if necessary) 5 at home.

Semifinals

|}

Finals

|}

Cypriot clubs in European competitions

References

External links
Cyprus Basketball Federation
Cyprus at Eurobasket.com

Cyprus
Basketball
Basketball
Cyprus Basketball Division 1